Ranga Poshteh (also Romanized as Rangā Poshteh; also known as Rangeh Poshteh) is a village in Sakht Sar Rural District, in the Central District of Ramsar County, Mazandaran Province, Iran. At the 2006 census, its population was 43, in 11 families.

References 

Populated places in Ramsar County